The Campaign for Homosexual Equality (CHE) is a membership organisation in the United Kingdom with a stated aim from 1969 to promote legal and social equality for lesbians, gay men and bisexuals in England and Wales. Active throughout the 1970s  and becoming a mass-membership organisation during this time  CHE's membership declined in the 1980s.

History

CHE began in Manchester as the North-Western Homosexual Law Reform Committee in 1964 as a local branch of the Homosexual Law Reform Society. An initial meeting was held on 4 June 1964, but only about eight people attended. A decision was made to re-establish the group on a wider basis, and an "advisory group" formed. This group chose the name "North-Western Homosexual Law Reform Committee". The new group was launched at Church House, Deansgate, Manchester, on 7 October 1964. Allan Horsfall was its secretary and most visible member. In 1969 the NWHLRC was renamed the Committee for Homosexual Equality with aims to becoming a national body for England and Wales, meeting at the Swarthmoor Centre in Leeds in 1971 and later in the same year changed its name to the Campaign for Homosexual Equality (CHE). 

London Friend was set up in London in 1972 intended to provide counselling. In 1972, CHE members took part in the first London Pride at Hyde Park, followed by a march to Trafalgar Square, nominally to protest at the age of consent, then age 21. That year, CHE had become the largest lesbian and gay rights organisation in the country, representing a more reformist goal than the liberationist Gay Liberation Front. By 1973 it held the first national gay rights conference in Morecambe. In this period, CHE claimed 5,000 members and some 100 local groups. 

In 1974, CHE appeared alongside London Friend in a documentary titled Speak for Yourself produced by London Weekend Television, at which time the organisation's offices were in at 22 Great Windmill Street, London and Friend was at 47 Church St, London NW8. The organisations worked closely together through social events. CHE at the time had 4000 members and was involved in campaigns and politics, whereas Friend was a counselling service. It organised a national Homosexual Equality Rally in London. The rally was supported by the women's movement and people from ethnic minorities. Where earlier actions had concentrated on legal protection from criminal persecution, this rally was part of gay and lesbian people starting to establish a distinct sexual identity. Those who turned out for the rally did so to support the extension of constitutional rights and universal values to lesbian and gay people. CHE and London Friend shared offices and had close links until 1974. Friend was separated from CHE in 1975. 

In May 1974, CHE’s Working Party on Law Reform proposed lowering the age of consent to sixteen, or twelve in some legal cases. At the time 200-300 youth, mostly young men between 16-20 years old, were being prosecuted for consensual homosexual acts every year. After internal review the idea of twelve for age of consent was dropped in 1973. In 1972 there was movement by heterosexual activists to make their age of consent fourteen. In 1977, CHE passed a resolution at its conference, “supported by the vast majority of delegates”, which condemned press harassment of the Paedophile Information Exchange. 

At a fringe meeting of the organisation held in Coventry in 1978, a new separate international organisation was formed, named ILGA, which later became International Lesbian, Gay, Bisexual, Trans and Intersex Association.

In 1979, its offices were moved from Manchester to London. In the 1980s, the group campaigned for further law reform and on issues such as Section 28. That decade, the CHE decided to focus on campaigning and diverted its attention away from local groups; this led to a loss in membership during the decade.

In 2005, the organisation received a substantial bequest from a former member, Derek Oyston of Gateshead. In early 2009 the organisation were campaigning to prevent cases of historic child sex abuse being prosecuted if raised more than five years after the young person gained age of majority; this, alongside issues relating to CHE's membership, "governance, constitution, electoral process policy-making process [and] financial transparency" led to its disaffiliation from Liberty.

Lord Smith of Finsbury became a vice-president of CHE in February 2009. In 2010 the organisation commissioned a book titled Amiable Warriors: A Space to Breathe, 1954 - 1973, by Peter Scott-Presland to write their own account of the organisation's history. 

The organisation received the 2014 Alan Turing Memorial Award as part of the Homo Heroes Awards ceremony organised by the Lesbian and Gay Foundation. From 2015 the organisation has stated on its page that it "no longer has the resources to offer assistance to individuals experiencing discrimination, whether in the UK or elsewhere."

See also

 Tory Campaign for Homosexual Equality (TORCHE)
 LGBT rights in the United Kingdom
 List of LGBT rights organizations

References

External links
 CHE official web site
 History of Gay Rights campaigning in Manchester
 Unofficial history of CHE by Ray Gosling
 Catalogue of the papers of the Campaign for Homosexual Equality at the Archives Division of the London School of Economics
 Archive catalogue of the Lancaster and Morecambe CHE Branch

LGBT history in the United Kingdom
LGBT political advocacy groups in the United Kingdom
1964 establishments in the United Kingdom
Organizations established in 1964
Political organisations based in London